The 2009 CEMAC Cup was the sixth edition of the CEMAC Cup, the football championship of Central African nations.

The tournament was held from December 1 to December 13 in the Central African Republic. The tournament was played by 6 teams composed just by players based on local clubs. All matches were played in the Barthelemy Boganda Stadium. Central African Republic managed to beat Equatorial Guinea in the final by 3-0, and won their first title in this tournament.

First round

Group A

Group B

Knockout round

Semi-finals

3rd place playoff

Final

Individual scorers

5 goals
 Hilaire Momi

4 goals
 Geoffroy Ngame Essono

2 goals
 Yaya Kerim
 Karl Max Dany
 Johan Lengoualama

1 goal
 Kelvin Agbor
 Amorese Dertin
 Ferdinand Kémo
 Salif Keita
 Ahmed-Evariste Medego
 Leger Djime
 Durel Akoli
 José-Princelin Kouyou
 Daniel Ekedo
 Manuel 'Ricky' Esono
 Landry Mpondo

References
RSSSF archives

CEMAC Cup
2009 in African football
CEMAC